The 1965–66 Idaho Vandals men's basketball team represented the University of Idaho during the 1965–66 NCAA University Division basketball season. Charter members of the Big Sky Conference, the Vandals were led by third-year head coach Jim Goddard and played their home games on campus at the Memorial Gymnasium in Moscow, Idaho. They were 12–14 overall and 2–8 in conference play.

Goddard unexpectedly resigned in August 1966 for an administrative position at the Oregon department of education  He was succeeded by alumnus Wayne Anderson, a longtime assistant and head baseball coach.

References

External links
Sports Reference – Idaho Vandals: 1965–66 basketball season
Gem of the Mountains: 1966 University of Idaho yearbook – 1965–66 basketball season
Idaho Argonaut – student newspaper – 1966 editions

Idaho Vandals men's basketball seasons
Idaho
Idaho
Idaho